Protected areas of Russia, (official Russian title: , literally "Specially Protected Natural Areas"), is governed by the corresponding 1995 law of the Russian Federation.

Categories
The law establishes the following categories of protected areas:
 State nature zapovedniks, including Biosphere reserves (biosphere zapovedniks)
 National Parks
 Nature parks
 State nature zakazniks
 Natural Monuments
 Dendrological parks and botanical gardens
 Health recuperation areas and  health resorts

Other areas
Other areas that are protected in Russia include:
 UNESCO World Heritage Sites.
 city and regional parks.
 Ramsar sites — wetlands of international  significance.
 Russian Cultural heritage monuments.
 Historic buildings and gardens — e.g.: Imperial Russian palaces and their landscape parks.

Total Land Area
On May 21, 2019, the Moscow Times cited a World Wildlife Fund report indicating that Russia now ranks first in the world for its amount of protected natural areas with 63.3 million hectares of specially protected natural areas. However, the article did not contain a link to WWF's report and it may be based on previously gathered data.

See also
List of national parks of Russia
List of zapovedniks of Russia
Territory of Traditional Natural Resource Use

References

 
.
Environment of Russia
Historic sites in Russia
Russia
Russia geography-related lists